These are the results of the swimming competition at the 1975 World Aquatics Championships.

Medal table

Medal summary

Men

Legend: WR – World record; CR – Championship record

Women

Legend: WR – World record; CR – Championship record

References
HistoFINA Men
HistoFINA Women

1975 World Aquatics Championships
Swimming at the World Aquatics Championships
1975 in swimming